Rangile Dost is a Bollywood film. It was released in 1944.

References

External links
 

1944 films
1940s Hindi-language films
Indian black-and-white films